Jaturong Pimkoon is a Thai professional footballer who plays as a forward for Thai League 2 club Chainat Hornbill.

International career

Jaturong won the AFF U-19 Youth Championship with Thailand U19, and played in 2012 AFC U-19 Championship.

International goals

Under-19

Under-23

Honours

Club
BEC Tero Sasana
 Thai League Cup: 2014
 Toyota Premier Cup: 2015

International
Thailand U-19
 AFF U-19 Youth Championship: 2011

External links
 
 

1993 births
Living people
Jaturong Pimkoon
Jaturong Pimkoon
Association football forwards
Jaturong Pimkoon
Jaturong Pimkoon
Jaturong Pimkoon
Jaturong Pimkoon
Jaturong Pimkoon